Garsak-e Pain (also Romanized as Garsak-e Pā’īn; also known as Garsag, Garsak, Gerasg, and Pā’īn Gerasg) is a village in Lat Leyl Rural District, Otaqvar District, Langarud County, Gilan Province, Iran. At the 2006 census, its population was 372, in 86 families.

References 

Populated places in Langarud County